80 Days or Eighty Days may refer to:

80 Days (2005 video game), a 2005 video game for Windows developed by Frogwares
80 Days (2014 video game), a 2014 video game developed by Inkle
"Eighty Days", by Marillion from their 1997 album This Strange Engine
Eighty Days, a series of erotic novels by Vina Jackson

See also
Around the World in Eighty Days, a novel by Jules Verne
 Around the World in Eighty Days (disambiguation)